bitforms gallery is a gallery in New York City devoted to new media art practices.
It was founded in 2001 by Steven Sacks, and represents established, mid-career, and emerging artists critically engaged with new technologies.  

In September 2014, bitforms gallery relocated from Chelsea to the Lower East Side in a ground-level storefront space on Allen Street.
In 2017, they opened a San Francisco popup, which became permanent by 2021.

See also 
 New media art
 Digital art
 Generative art
 Post-Internet

References

External links
 

Contemporary art galleries in the United States
2001 establishments in New York (state)
Art museums and galleries in Manhattan
Art galleries established in 2001
Chelsea, Manhattan